Arthur Fletcher (January 5, 1885 – February 6, 1950) was an American shortstop, manager and coach in Major League Baseball. Fletcher was associated with two New York City baseball dynasties: the Giants of John McGraw as a player; and the Yankees of Miller Huggins and Joe McCarthy as a coach.

Career

Fletcher came to the Giants in  after only one season of minor league experience, and became the club's regular shortstop two years later. He played in four World Series while performing for McGraw (1911, 1912, 1913 and 1917). Traded to the Philadelphia Phillies in the midst of the  season, he retired after the 1922 campaign with 1,534 hits, 32 home runs, 676 RBI and a .277 batting average.  Fletcher is the Giants' career leader in being hit by pitches (132) and ranks 29th on the MLB career list (141) for the same statistic.

In  he replaced Kaiser Wilhelm as manager of the seventh-place Phillies and led the club through four losing seasons, bookended by last-place finishes in 1923 and 1926. In October 1926, he was replaced by Stuffy McInnis.

Fletcher then began a 19-year tenure (1927–1945) as a coach for the Yankees, where, beginning with the legendary 1927 team, he would participate on ten American League pennant winners and nine World Series champions. On a tragic note, he served as the acting manager of Yankees for the last 11 games of the  season when Huggins, 50, was fatally stricken with erysipelas and pyaemia. Fletcher won six of those 11 games, to compile a career major league managing record of 237–383 (.382).

Managerial record

Post career
Fletcher retired after the 1945 season and died from a heart attack in 1950 in Los Angeles at the age of 65.

Arthur Fletcher Field, in his Illinois hometown, is named for him. The field is home of the Collinsville High School Kahoks, the Collinsville Miners American Legion team, and the Collinsville Herr Travelers junior legion team.

See also
List of Major League Baseball career stolen bases leaders

References

External links

The Dead Ball Era

1885 births
1950 deaths
Baseball players from Illinois
Dallas Giants players
Major League Baseball shortstops
Major League Baseball third base coaches
New York Giants (NL) players
New York Yankees coaches
New York Yankees managers
People from Collinsville, Illinois
Philadelphia Phillies managers
Philadelphia Phillies players